Mario Rivillos Plaza (born 13 December 1989), commonly known as Rivillos, is a Spanish futsal player who plays for Levante UD FS as an Ala.

Honours
1 Primera División: 2013–14
1 Copa de España:2014
 Supercopa de España de Futsal: Runner-up 2014
1 UEFA Futsal Championship: UEFA Futsal Euro 2016

References

External links
lnfs.es profile

1989 births
Living people
Spanish men's futsal players
Inter FS players
People from Torrejón de Ardoz
Sportspeople from the Community of Madrid